Tourism in Nigeria centers largely on events, due to the country's ample amount of ethnic groups, but also includes rain forests, savannah, waterfalls, and other natural attractions. Tourists spent US$2.6 billion in Nigeria in 2015. This dropped to US$1.5 billion in 2017, probably due to the rise of the Boko Haram insurgency of 2015.

Attractions 
Abuja is home to several parks and green areas with the largest one being Millennium Park. Millennium Park was designed by architect Manfredi Nicoletti and was officially opened by the United Kingdom's Elizabeth II in December 2003. Another open area park is located in Lifecamp Gwarimpa; near the residence of the Minister of the Federal Capital Territory. The park is located on a slightly raised hilltop which contains sport facilities like Basketball and Badminton courts another park is the city park, it is located in wuse 2 and is home to numerous outdoor and indoor attractions such as a 4D cinema, astro-turf, lawn tennis court, paintball arena and a variety of restaurants.

Lagos, subsequent to the re-modernization project achieved by the previous administration of Governor Raji Babatunde Fashola, is gradually becoming a major tourist destination, being one of the largest cities in Africa and in the world. Lagos is currently taking steps to become a global city. The 2009 Eyo carnival (a yearly festival originated from Iperu Remo, Ogun State), which took place on 25 April, was a step toward world city status. Currently, Lagos is primarily known as a business-oriented and a fast-paced community.

Urban tourism 
Lagos has become an important location for African and "black" cultural identity. Many festivals are held in Lagos; festivals vary in offerings each year and may be held in different months. Some of the festivals are Festac Food Fair held in Festac Town Annually by Festaconline, Eyo Festival, Lagos Black Heritage Carnival, Lagos Carnival, Eko International Film Festival, Lagos Seafood Festac Festival, LAGOS PHOTO Festival and the Lagos Jazz Series, which is a unique franchise for high-quality live music in all genres with a focus on jazz. Established in 2010, the popular event takes place over a 3–5 day period at selected high quality outdoor venues. The music is as varied as the audience itself and features a diverse mix of musical genres from rhythm and blues to soul, Afrobeat, hip hop, bebop, and traditional jazz. The festivals provide entertainment of dance and song to add excitement to travelers during a stay in Lagos.

Lagos has a number of sandy beaches by the Atlantic Ocean, including Elegushi Beach and Alpha Beach. Lagos also has a number of private beach resorts including Inagbe Grand Beach Resort and several others in the outskirts.

Lagos has a variety of hotels ranging from three star to five star hotels, with a mixture of local hotels such as Eko Hotels and Suites, Federal Palace Hotel and franchises of multinational chains such as Intercontinental Hotel, Sheraton and Four Points by Hilton. Other places of interest include the Tafawa Balewa Square, Festac town, The Nike Art Gallery, Freedom Park, Lagos and the Cathedral Church of Christ, Lagos.

Resorts and regional tourism 
Obudu Mountain Resort is a ranch and resort on the Obudu Plateau in Cross River State. It was developed in 1951 by M. McCaughley, a Scot who first explored the mountain ranges in 1949. He camped on the mountaintop of the Oshie Ridge on the Sankwala Mountains for a month before returning with Mr. Hugh Jones a fellow rancher in 1951. Together with Dr Crawfeild, they developed the Obudu Cattle Ranch. Although the ranch has been through troubles since, it has been rehabilitated to its former glory.

Since 2005, a cable car climbing  from the base to the top of the plateau gives visitors a scenic view while bypassing the extremely winding road to the top.
It is about 30 minutes drive from Obudu town and is about a  drive from Calabar, the Cross River State capital. Charter air service is available to the Bebi Airport which lies between the village of Obudu and the resort. The ranch has in recent times seen an influx of both Nigerian and international tourists because of the development of tourist facilities by Cross-River State Government, which has turned the ranch into a well known holiday and tourist resort center in Nigeria.

Also, Ibeno Beach is one of the most beautiful beaches in the country and the longest coastline sand beach in Nigeria and West Africa. It is situated in Jamestown in Akwa Ibom. The city is said to be named after the local government where it is located. According to historians, the beach is one of the oldest beaches in Nigeria.

Regulation, awareness and promotion 
The tourism industry is regulated by the Federal Ministry of Information and National Orientation (Nigeria).

In an attempt to raise the profile of the country's tourism sector, a beauty pageant, the Miss Tourism Nigeria Pageant, was created in 2004. The winners in 2004, 2005, and 2006 have been, respectively, Shirley Aghotse, Abigail Longe, and Gloria Zirigbe.

In 2017, Olufeko's research in design and its intersections with anthropology, led to a journey inside Sungbo's Eredo, bringing the rampart's narrative back into social dialogue.

See also 
Visa policy of Nigeria
List of national parks of Nigeria
List of museums in Nigeria
Olumo Rock
Sungbo's Eredo
Tarkwa Bay Beach
Kajuru Castle
Tinapa Resort

References

External links 
 

 
Nigeria